Sphingonotus imitans, the Algarve sand grasshopper, is a species of band-winged grasshopper in the family Acrididae. It is found on the Iberian Peninsula.

The IUCN conservation status of Sphingonotus imitans is "VU", vulnerable. The species faces a high risk of endangerment in the medium term. The IUCN status was assessed in 2015.

References

External links

 

Oedipodinae